Alison Margaret Smithson (22 June 1928 – 14 August 1993) and Peter Denham Smithson (18 September 1923 – 3 March 2003) were English architects who together formed an architectural partnership, and are often associated with the New Brutalism, especially in architectural and urban theory.

Education and personal lives 
Peter was born in Stockton-on-Tees in County Durham, north-east England, and Alison Margaret Gill was born in Sheffield, West Riding of Yorkshire.

Alison studied architecture at King's College, Durham in Newcastle (later the Newcastle University School of Architecture, Planning and Landscape), then part of the University of Durham, between 1944 and 1949. Peter studied architecture at the same university between 1939 and 1948, along with a programme in the Department of Town Planning, also at King's, between 1946 and 1948. His studies were interrupted by war, and from 1942 he served in the Madras Sappers and Miners in India and Burma. 

Peter and Alison had met at Durham, and they married in 1949. In the same year they both joined the architecture department of the London County Council as Temporary Technical Assistants before establishing their own partnership in 1950.

Of their three children, Simon, Samantha and Soraya, one, Simon, is an architect.

Alison Smithson published a novel A Portrait of the Female Mind as a Young Girl in 1966.

Work

The Smithsons first came to prominence with Hunstanton School, Norfolk completed in 1954, which used some of the language of high modernist Ludwig Mies van der Rohe but in a stripped back way, with rough finishes and a deliberate lack of refinement that kept architectural structure and services exposed. They are arguably among the leaders of the British school of New Brutalism. They referred to New Brutalism as "an ethic, not an aesthetic". It was a "brute" injunction to social relevance, “an attempt to be objective about ‘reality’”, its aim to “drag a rough poetry out of the confused and powerful forces which are at work.”  Their work sought to connect architecture with what they viewed as the realities of modern life in post-war Britain. Their definitions and interpretation of Brutalism put them at odds with their contemporary Reyner Banham, an architecture critic known for his work in defining the stylistic components of New Brutalism. Alison Smithson articulated their desire to connect building, users, and site when, describing architecture as an act of "form-giving", she noted: "My act of form-giving has to invite the occupiers to add their intangible quality of use." As such, they turned against the formal unity of classical proportion and symmetry, governed by principles of geometry, to instead fashion architecture on the topological principle of "form in process" or "deforming form," governed by qualities of circulation, penetration, and thresholds, as most especially evident in their Robin Hood Gardens scheme. After the critical success of Hunstanton School, they were associated with Team X and its 1953 revolt against old Congrès International d'Architecture Moderne (CIAM) philosophies of high modernism.

Among their early contributions were 'streets in the sky' in which traffic and pedestrian circulation were rigorously separated, a theme popular in the 1960s. They were members of the Independent Group participating in the 1953 Parallel of Life and Art exhibition at the Institute of Contemporary Arts and This Is Tomorrow in 1956. Throughout their career they published their work energetically, including their several unbuilt schemes, giving them a profile, at least among other architects, out of proportion to their relatively modest output.

Peter Smithson's teaching activity included the participation for many years at the ILAUD workshops together with fellow architect Giancarlo De Carlo.

National Life Stories conducted an oral history interview (C467/24) with Peter Smithson in 1997 for its Architects Lives' collection held by the British Library.

Built projects

Their built projects include:
Smithdon High School, Hunstanton, Norfolk (1949–54; a Grade II* listed building)
 The House of the Future exhibition at the 1956 Ideal Home Show
 Family house for acoustician and engineer Derek Sugden, Watford (1956)
 Upper Lawn Pavillion, Fonthill Estate, Tisbury, Wiltshire (1959–62)
 Office tower for The Economist, members accommodation for Boodles, bank and art gallery, St James's Street, London – often known as the Economist Plaza (1959–65)
Garden building, St Hilda's College, Oxford (1968)
Private house extension for Lord Kennet, Bayswater, London, 1960
Robin Hood Gardens housing complex, Poplar, East London (1969–72)
Buildings at the University of Bath, including the School of Architecture and Building Engineering (1988)
Their last project: the Cantilever-Chair Museum of the Bauhaus design company TECTA in Lauenfoerde, Germany

Robin Hood Gardens was under construction when B. S. Johnson made a short film about the couple for the BBC, The Smithsons on Housing (1970). Sukhdev Sandhu, in a blog entry for the London Telegraph website, wrote that "they drone in self-pitying fashion about vandals and local naysayers to such an extent that any traces of visionary utopianism are extinguished." The finished flats suffered from high costs associated with the system selected and from high levels of crime, all of which undermined the modernist vision of 'streets in the sky' and the Smithsons' architectural reputation. In 2017, with the flats set to be demolished, a three-storey section including a walkway and maisonette interiors was acquired by the Victoria and Albert Museum.

They would go on to design several buildings at Bath, while relying mainly on private overseas commissions and Peter Smithson's writing and teaching (he was a visiting professor at Bath from 1978 to 1990, and also a unit master at the Architectural Association School of Architecture).

Unbuilt proposals
Their unbuilt schemes include:
Coventry Cathedral unsuccessful competition entry, 1951
Golden Lane Estate unsuccessful competition entry, 1952
Sheffield University, unsuccessful competition entry
Hauptstadt, unsuccessful competition entry, 1957
British Embassy, Brasília, competition-winning design, unbuilt due to financial constraints, 1961

Bibliography
 Crinson, Mark, Alison and Peter Smithson, Historic England, 2018
 Boyer, Christine M., Not Quite Architecture. Writing around Alison and Peter Smithson, Cambridge MA, The MIT Press, 2018
 Henley, Simon (2017) Brutalism Redefined, RIBA Publications; 
 Powers, Alan (September 2008) 'Casework' The Twentieth Century Society: Robin Hood Gardens
 Risselada, Max; van den Heuvel, Dirk (2005) Team 10: In Search of a Utopia of the Present, NAi Publishers,Rotterdam, 320 pages. 
 Van den Heuvel, Dirk, Risselada, Max (eds.), Alison and Peter Smithson. From the House of the Future to a House of Today, 010 Publishers, Rotterdam, 2004 
 A.R.Emili, Pure and simple, the Architecture of New Brutalism, Ed. Kappa, Rome 2008
 Webster, Helena (ed.), Modernism without Rhetoric. Essays on the Work of Alison and Peter Smithson, Academy Editions, London, 1997
 Vidotto, Marco, A+P Smithson. Pensieri, progetti e frammenti fino al 1990, Genova, Sagep Editrice, 1991
 Thoburn, Nicholas, Brutalism as Found: Housing, Form and Crisis at Robin Hood Gardens, Goldsmiths Press, 2022; 
Books
 Smithson, Alison. A Portrait of the Female Mind As a Young Girl: A Novel. Chatto & Windus, 1966.
 Smithson, Alison, and Peter Smithson. Urban Structuring : Studies. Reinhold U.a, 1967.
 Smithson, Alison, and Peter Smithson (with foreword by Nikolaus Pevsner). The Euston Arch and the growth of the London, Midland and Scottish Railway, Thames & Hudson 1968.
 Smithson, Alison, and Peter Smithson. Ordinariness and Light: Urban Theories, 1952–1960. MIT Press, 1970.
 Smithson, Alison, and Peter Smithson. Without Rhetoric: An Architectural Aesthetic, 1955–1972. M.I.T. Press, 1974.
 Smithson, Alison, and Peter Smithson. The Heroic Period of Modern Architecture. Rizzoli, 1981.
 Smithson, Alison, and Peter Smithson. The Charged Void: Architecture. Monacelli Press, 2001.
 Smithson, Alison, and Peter Smithson. The Charged Void: Urbanism. Monacelli Press, 2004.
Articles
 Smithson, Alison, and Peter Smithson. “Density, Interval and Measure.” Ekistics, vol. 25, no. 147, 1968, pp. 70–72.
 Smithson, Alison, and Peter Smithson. “The New Brutalism.” October, vol. 1, no. 136, 2011, pp. 37–37.

References

Sources

External links
 The Economist building information & photos

20th-century English architects
Brutalist architects
Married couples
Alumni of Durham University
People associated with the University of Bath
Congrès International d'Architecture Moderne members
Modernist architects from England
Architecture firms of the United Kingdom